Harri Nuutinen (born 3 October 1962 in Helsinki, Finland) is a Finnish singer. He won the popular song vocals SM Contests old dance series in 1977.

Discography
Harri Nuutinen (1977)
Sept ruskan time (1978)
Laulellen and playing (1979)
Rose friend (1980)
Callback hanurin (1982)
Harri Nuutinen (1982)
Harri Nuutinen (1980)
Dance magic is (1999)

References

1962 births
Living people
20th-century Finnish male singers